Jaanimäe is a village in Setomaa Parish, Võru County in southeastern Estonia.

Before 2017 this village belonged to Meremäe Parish.

References

Villages in Võru County